Sailing Directions are written directions that describe the routes to be taken by boats and ships during coastal navigation and port approaches. There are also products known as Sailing Directions, which are books written by various Hydrographic Offices throughout the world. They are known as Pilot Books, because they provide local knowledge of routes and landmarks, which would typically be provided by a local marine pilot. As such, they are used frequently by naval and government vessels, who are exempted from 'Compulsory Pilotage' in many ports.

Many nations publish Sailing Directions for their home waters, where they are the International Hydrographic Organization's (IHO) primary charting authority. However, the most widely used Sailing Directions product is the United Kingdom Hydrographic Office's, 'Admiralty Sailing directions' (ASDs)( a.k.a. Pilot books). The ASDs, sold under the Admiralty brand, provide the most comprehensive geographic coverage of coastal routes worldwide. They are designed to supplement and enhance the data shown on British Admiralty Nautical Charts, by describing routes for seagoing vessels, relative to coastal features. Ocean routes are covered by the Admiralty book 'Ocean Passages for The World' (Abbrev. OPTW. Nautical Publication  NP136), which describes Offshore routes separately for power driven vessels, and low powered / sailing vessels.

American Sailing Directions 
There is a 42-volume American navigation publication published by the National Geospatial-Intelligence Agency (NGA). Sailing Directions consists of 37 Enroute volumes, 4 Planning Guide volumes, and 1 volume combining both types. Planning Guides describe general features of ocean basins and country-specific information such as firing areas, pilotage requirements, regulations, search and rescue information, ship reporting systems, and time zones; routes describe features of coastlines, ports, and harbors.

The American Sailing Directions are available for free download, via the NGA MSI Portal Also, via the Office of Coastal Survey's website, as well as other products, including charts.

Sailing Directions are updated when new data requires extensive revision of an existing text. These data are obtained from several sources, including pilots and Sailing Directions from other countries.

This consolidation allows for a more effective presentation of material on this unique area.

Sailing Directions (Planning Guide) and Sailing Directions (Enroute) are frequently updated. In early 2005, NGA discontinued production of these publications in printed form; subsequent editions were distributed in digital form only. Between editions, Sailing Directions are corrected via a binary patch process referred to as Publication Data Update (PDU).

Figure 1 shows an overview of Sailing Directions coverage.

Planning Guide

Planning Guide volumes assist the navigator in planning an extensive oceanic voyage, and give information on individual countries that is applicable to all ports in those countries. Each of the Planning Guides covers an area determined by an arbitrary division of the world's seas.

Individual Planning Guides are divided into Countries and Ocean Basins, as follows:
Pub. 120—51 Countries and 1 Ocean Basin (Pacific Ocean).
Pub. 140—87 Countries and 6 Ocean Basins (Baltic Sea, Black Sea, Caribbean Sea, Mediterranean Sea, North Atlantic Ocean, and North Sea/English Channel).
Pub. 160—61 Countries and 3 Ocean Basins (Indian Ocean, South Atlantic Ocean, and Red Sea/Persian Gulf).
Pub. 180—5 Countries and 1 Ocean Basin (Arctic Ocean).

Country entries may contain information on the following subjects—buoyage systems, currency, firing areas, fishing areas, government, holidays, ice, industries, languages, mined areas, navigational information (to include maritime claims, maritime boundary disputes, and enroute volumes), offshore drilling, pilotage, pollution, prohibited areas, regulations, restricted areas, search and rescue, signals, submarine operating areas, time zone, traffic separation schemes, U.S. embassy, and vessel traffic services. Information that cannot be accurately depicted within the alphabeticized country text may be listed as an appendix at the end of the country text.

Ocean casin entries may contain information on the following subjects—climatology, currents, fishing areas, geophysical features, ice, ionospheric disturbance, magnetic field, meteorology, mined areas, navigational information, optical phenomena, pilotage, pollution, regulations, routes, seas, ship reporting systems, tides, and surface temperatures.

Enroute

Each Enroute volume contains numbered sectors along a coast or through a strait. Each sector is discussed in turn. A preface with detailed information about authorities, references, and conventions used in each book precedes the sector discussions. A table showing conversions between feet, fathoms, and meters is provided. Finally, each volume provides a list of commonly used abbreviations that may be found in the text.

The chart information graphics, the first items in each sector, are a graphic key for charts and digital nautical charts (DNC) pertaining to a sector. The graduation of the border scale of the chartlets enable navigators to identify the largest scale chart for a location and to find a feature listed in the index-gazetteer.

A foreign terms glossary and a comprehensive index-gazetteer follow the sector discussions.

The index-gazetteer is an alphabetical listing of described and charted features. The index-gazetteer lists each feature by geographic coordinates and sector-paragraph number.

Sources
The text of this article originated from sections 402 to 404 of the American Practical Navigator, a document produced by the government of the United States of America and amended by marine analysts at the National Geospatial-Intelligence Agency.

UKHO Pilot Books
The UKHO publish a global set of sailing directions under their Admiralty brand. These are available in both hardcopy and digital eBook format.

See also
American Practical Navigator
Australian Pilot
Buoy
Coast Pilots
Light List
List of Lights
Local Notice to Mariners
Notice to Mariners

References

External links
 Chapter 4: Nautical Publications - from the online edition of Nathaniel Bowditch's American Practical Navigator
 All Enroute and Planning Guide volumes for PDF download
 National Geospatial–Intelligence Agency Sailing Instructions Enroute
 Coast Pilots These nine volumes correspond to the Sailing Directions in the United States and Territories
 List of Sailing Directions available online (Nautical Free)

Navigation
Hydrography
Sailing books

es:Derrotero
pl:Locja